Ngo may refer to: 

Vengo language 
the prestige dialect of the Obolo language